Agnes Agnew Hardie (née Pettigrew; 6 September 1874 – 24 March 1951) was a British Labour politician.

Early life 
Her association with the Labour movement began when she was a shop girl in Glasgow. She was a pioneer member of the Shop Assistants' Union, acting for some years as organizer. During the First World War she was a woman's organizer of the Labour Party and was a member of the then Glasgow Education Authority. She married George Hardie, who was a member of parliament (MP) and brother of Keir Hardie.  After an early career in the National Union of Shop Assistants, she was the Women's Organizer for the Labour Party in Scotland from 1918 to 1923.

Career 
At the Glasgow Springburn by-election in 1937 caused by the death of her husband, she was elected as member of parliament (MP) for Glasgow Springburn, and held the seat until her retirement at the 1945 general election. On her election she was Glasgow's first female MP, the fifth female MP ever to be elected in Scotland and the second Scottish Labour MP, after Jennie Lee.

See also
George Hardie MP

References

External links 
 
 Agnes Hardie: Biography on Undiscovered Scotland

1874 births
1951 deaths
Members of the Parliament of the United Kingdom for Scottish constituencies
Scottish Labour MPs
Female members of the Parliament of the United Kingdom for Scottish constituencies
UK MPs 1935–1945
Members of the Parliament of the United Kingdom for Glasgow constituencies
20th-century Scottish women politicians
20th-century Scottish politicians
Springburn
Parliamentary Peace Aims Group